Vahram Sargsyan (alternate transliterations include Sarkissian or Sargissian, Armenian: Վահրամ Սարգսյան; born 28 May 1981, Yerevan, Armenia) is an Armenian Canadian composer, choral conductor and experimental vocalist currently living in Montreal, Quebec, Canada.

Biography
Vahram Sargsyan studied at the P. Tchaikovsky Musical College, at the Music Theory Faculty. He then studied composition with Ashot Zohrabyan at the Yerevan Komitas State Conservatory from 1998 to 2003, where he also studied conducting with Tigran Hekekyan from 2000 to 2006 and where he has had post-graduate studies in composition again with Ashot Zohrabyan from 2005 to 2007.  Currently he is working towards his master's degree in composition at Schulich School of Music, McGill University with Philippe Leroux.

Sargsyan's music has been performed in Armenia, UK, Germany, Austria, Belarus, Sweden, Lithuania, Latvia, Belgium, Russia, Greece, Poland, Italy, Japan, Canada, as well as in the United States. His composition Luis Zvart was performed at the 6th World Symposium on Choral Music (Minneapolis, Minnesota 2002). His arrangement of Khorurd Metz (Great Mystery) is included in the Oxford University Press anthology World Carols for Choirs (2005) and has been recorded by BBC Singers. It has been broadcast by BBC Radio 3.

He has had commissions from Oxford University Press (UK), A.R.CO.VA.(Italy), Boston Choral Ensemble (USA), Norddeutscher Rundfunk (Germany), AGBU Foundation (USA), CBC Radio and others. Sargsyan's work Hunting the Hunter was premiered under his own baton in 2012 at Carnegie Hall.

Vahram Sargsyan's name has appeared in Who is Who in Choral Music since 2007. He is a member of Union of Composers and Musicologists of Armenia. He served as a music consultant for European Choral Association - Europa Cantat from 2010 to 2012.

Awards

The winner award in the POLYPHONOS 2017 Commission Competition (Seattle, USA 2016)
Third prize in the Godfrey Ridout Awards from the Socan Foundation  (2012, for Tribulationes);
The winner award in the 3rd BCE Commission Competition (Boston, USA 2010, for Tribulationes)
1st prize in the International Contest for New Choral Compositions (Petrinja, Croatia 2009, for Anegh Bnutiun);
An award from the World Armenian Congress “for creative achievements” (2009, for Mythis);
Co-winner award at the European Seminar for Young Composers (Aosta, Italy 2008, for Laudate Dominum);
An award in the Choral Composition Competition in Yerevan, Armenia (2006, for Tantum ergo).

Selected works

Orchestral

Ter yete - God, if (cantata), mixed chorus, large orchestra (64 players), 2003
Mythis, 18 strings, 2008

Chamber music
Five Images, cello, piano, 1996
Poem, cello, piano, 1998
Sonatina, clarinet, piano, 1999
String Quartet, 2000
Music for 13, large ensemble (13 players), 2002
Selbstvergessenheit, 2 clarinets, cello, piano, 2006
Deux Silhouettes Féminines (texts by Paul Fort, Yeghishe Charents), soprano, clarinet, violin, cello, piano, 2007
Hunting the Hunter, clarinet, marimba, 2 violins, viola, cello, piano, 2012
deperson, flute, clarinet, violin, cello, piano, 2013
Gandz, large ensemble, 2013

Choral
Tkhur meran - Sadly Departed (text by Vahan Terian), female chorus, 1999
Kesgisher - Midnight (text by Vahan Terian), mixed chorus, 1999
Voghormya - Lord, Have Mercy (text from Psalm 50 [Armenian translation]), mixed chorus, 2000
Luys Zvart - Joyful Light (text from an ancient Greek sacred text [Armenian translation]), female chorus, 2001 (also version for mixed chorus, 2006)
Lux aeterna, mixed chorus, 2004
Tantum ergo (text by St. Thomas Aquinas), mixed chorus, 2006
Domine Deus (text from the Gloria), 7 mixed voices, 2007
Laudate Dominum (text from Psalm 150), mixed chorus, 2008
Anegh Bnutiun (text by St. Nerses Shnorhali), female chorus, 2008 (also version for male chorus, 2009)
Dzaynik (text by Komitas Vardapet), female chorus, 2009
Ilik (folk text), female chorus, 2009
Stabat Mater, mixed chorus, 2010
Tribulationes (excerpts from the Psalms), mixed chorus, 2010
Wage Peace (text by Judyth Hill), mixed chorus, 2011

Piano
Visions, 1997
Variations, 1999

Arrangements
Sirt im sasani - My Heart Is Grieving over Judas (13th-century Armenian choral), mixed chorus, 2002;
Khorurd metz (Movses Khorenatsi), mixed chorus, 2002
Ousti Guqas (Sayat-Nova), clarinet, marimba, cello, 2012

References

Further reading
http://bostonchoral.org/commission-competition/winners/#0.1_sargsyan
http://blog.bostonchoral.org/2010/03/24/3rd-annual-commission-competition-comes-to-fruition/

External links
Vahram Sargsyan at the Armenian National Music website
Vahram Sargsyan's Biography at Composers21 Website 
Joyful Light by Little Singers of Armenia, cond. Tigran Hekekyan
Tribulationes by Boston Choral Ensemble, cond. Miguel Felipe

Musicians from Yerevan
Armenian composers
Armenian conductors (music)
Armenian choral conductors
1981 births
21st-century classical composers
Living people
Male classical composers
21st-century Armenian musicians
21st-century conductors (music)
21st-century male musicians